Randy Hogan may refer to:
 Randy Hogan (musician)
 Randy Hogan (wrestler)